The foreign relations of Norway are based on the country's membership in NATO and within the workings of the United Nations (UN). Additionally, despite not being a member of the European Union (EU), Norway takes a part in the integration of EU through its membership in the European Economic Area. Norway's foreign ministry includes both the minister of foreign affairs and minister of international development.

History

The Ministry of Foreign Affairs was established on the same day that Norway declared the dissolution of the union with Sweden: June 7, 1905. Although diplomats could not present credentials to foreign governments until the Swedish king formally renounced his right to the Norwegian throne, a number of unofficial representatives worked on the provisional government's behalf until the first Norwegian ambassador, Hjalmar Christian Hauge, sought accreditation by the United States Secretary of State Elihu Root on November 6, 1905.

The initial purposes of the newly formed Foreign Ministry were to represent Norway's interests through diplomatic channels, and to provide consular services for Norwegian shipping and commerce overseas. In 1906, the Storting decided to establish six embassies in Europe, with two more in the Americas: one in the United States and one in Argentina. 20 consular offices were also opened.

During World War I, the foreign ministry was confronted with unprecedented challenges in maintaining neutrality for Norway, in particular in order to protect its merchant fleet.

In 1922, the ministry was consolidated and reorganised to ensure fuller cooperation between the diplomatic and consular branches. The reorganization included the formation of a designated career path for diplomats that included completion of a university entrance examination and professional experience from international trade. The economic hardship of the times forced austerity measures at the ministry for the next several years.

When Norway was invaded by Nazi Germany in 1940, the government fled to the United Kingdom and reconstituted in exile in Bracknell, outside London. Kingston House in London was later used. The government moved back to Norway following the peace in 1945.

After the end of World War II, Norway was a founding member of the North Atlantic Treaty Organization and the United Nations, the latter having Norwegian Trygve Lie as inaugural Secretary-General. Norway was also part of the first slate of non-permanent members to the United Nations Security Council.

Elements of policy
Since the end of the Cold War, Norway has developed a model to foreign policy known as the "Norwegian model," the goal of which is to contribute to peace and stability through coordinated response among governmental and non-governmental Norwegian organizations; acting as an honest broker in international conflicts; an informal network of Norwegian individuals with access and credibility among parties; and the willingness to take the long view in international issues.

The post-war foreign policy of Norway can be described along four dimensions:

Strategic alliances
Norway's strategic importance for waging war in the North Atlantic became important in the failed neutrality policy of World War II.  Norway became a founding member of NATO in order to ally itself with countries that shared its democratic values.  Both through diplomatic and military cooperation, Norway has played a visible role in the formation and operations of NATO.  It allowed a limited number of military bases and exercises to be based in its territories, which caused some controversy when NATO decided to put forward bases in Northern Norway in preparation for a conflict with the Soviet Union.

International cooperation
Norway supports international cooperation and the peaceful settlement of disputes, recognizing the need for maintaining a strong national defence through collective security. Accordingly, the cornerstones of Norwegian policy are active membership in NATO and support for the United Nations and its specialized agencies. Norway also pursues a policy of economic, social, and cultural cooperation with other Nordic countries—Denmark, Sweden, Finland, and Iceland—through the Nordic Council. Its relations with Iceland are very close due to the cultural bond the two nations share. Norway ended a 2-year term on the UN Security Council in January 2003, and chaired the Iraq Sanctions Committee.

Norway, along with Iceland the Farore Islands, is not a member of the European Union, all three are members of the European Economic Area. Membership of the EU has been proposed within Norway, and referendums over Norwegian membership were held in 1972 and 1994. Popular opinion was split between rural and urban areas. See Norway and the European Union.

The present government is not planning to raise the possibility for future membership.

Norway also has a history of co-operation and friendship with the United Kingdom and Scotland, due to their shared cultural heritage since Viking times. The Vikings conquered areas including the Hebrides, Orkney and Shetland for several hundred years. Norway is only 300 kilometres (159 Nautical miles) east of Unst, the northernmost island of Shetland.  The Norwegian embassy to the United Kingdom is located in London, and Norway also maintains a Consulate General in Edinburgh. A Norway Spruce is given by the city of Oslo and presented to London as a Christmas tree for display in Trafalgar Square as a token of gratitude for the UK's support during World War II.  King Haakon, his son Crown Prince Olav and the country's government lived in exile in London throughout the war. As part of the tradition, the Lord Mayor of Westminster visits Oslo in the late autumn to take part in the felling of the tree, and the Mayor of Oslo then goes to London to light the tree at the Christmas ceremony.

On 25 April 2022, Norwegian foreign minister visited Bangladesh as part of her two-day trip in order to broadening economic partnership through trade, investment and maritime sector cooperation.

International mediation and nation building

Norway has played an active role as a third party mediator in a number of international conflicts.  The late foreign minister Johan Jørgen Holst was instrumental in forging the Oslo Accords between Israel and the PLO.  Thorvald Stoltenberg was part of the unsuccessful mediation team in seeking an end to the war in Bosnia.  Norway has contributed both mediation services and financial assistance in Guatemala.

As of 2005, Norwegian diplomats are acting as mediators in Sudan, Bosnia, Sri Lanka, and Colombia. Some of those countries accuse Norway of supporting and propping up separatist groups.  Israel is often bitter with harsh criticisms from Norwegian politicians. The spat was at its highest when finance minister Kristin Halvorsen supported boycott of Israeli goods. in early 2006. Finance ministry spokesman, Runar Malkenes, told BBC News that "there are no moves to push for a boycott of Israeli goods" at government level. Eritrea has been actively supported by Norway during its liberation from Ethiopia. As of recent, Ethiopia expelled six Norwegian diplomats due to Norway's alleged support to 'Terrorist group and Eritrea'. Norway retaliated by cutting aid to Ethiopia.

After the Al-Qaeda attack on the United States on September 11, 2001, NATO launched a military invasion to overthrow Al-Qaeda and its Taliban sponsors. Norway was one of 51 donors providing aid and assistance to rebuild the war-torn country. Norway had charge of Faryab Province. The Norwegian-led Provincial Reconstruction Team had the mission of effecting security, good governance and economic development, 2005–2012. But the results were dubious and frustration continued until the U.S. and all other countries finally decided to withdraw by 2021.

International disputes
Territorial claims in Antarctica (Queen Maud Land and Peter I Island) are only recognized by Australia, France, New Zealand and the United Kingdom.

Status-seeking 
A number of scholars have argued that Norway has through its foreign policy engaged in status-seeking. Through an activist foreign policy, Norway has sought to elevate its standing among the international system's small powers and middle powers, and earn recognition from the great powers.

Diplomatic relations

Africa

Americas

Asia

Europe

Oceania

See also 
List of diplomatic missions in Norway
List of diplomatic missions of Norway
List of ambassadors to Norway
Norway and the European Union
Norwegian Ministry of Foreign Affairs
Arctic policy of Norway

References

Further reading

 Berg, Roald. "Norway’s Foreign Politics during the Union with Sweden, 1814-1905: A Reconsideration." Diplomacy & Statecraft 31.1 (2020): 1-21. online Argues Norwegians did have a voice in foreign affairs.
 Danielsen, Helge. "Military Assistance, Foreign Policy, and National Security: The Objectives of US Military Assistance to Norway, 1950–1965." Scandinavian Journal of History 45.1 (2020): 71–94.
 Frankel, Joseph. "Comparing Foreign Policies: The Case of Norway." International Affairs 44.3 (1968): 482–493.
 German, Robert K. "Norway and the bear: Soviet coercive diplomacy and Norwegian security policy." International Security 7.2 (1982): 55-82  online.
 Holst, Johan Jørgen, ed. Norwegian Foreign Policy in the 1980s (Oxford UP, 1985).
 Lucas, Colin. "Great Britain and the Union of Norway and Sweden." Scandinavian Journal of History 15.3-4 (1990): 269–278.
 Lundestad, Geir. "The United States and Norway, 1905–2006 Allies of a kind: so similar, so different." Journal of Transatlantic Studies 4.2 (2006): 187–209.
 Lundestad, Geir.  "The evolution of Norwegian security policy: Alliance with the West and reassurance in the East." Scandinavian Journal of History 17.2-3 (1992): 227–256.
 Lundestad, Geir.  America, Scandinavia and the Cold War, 1945-1949 (1980),
 Padelford, Norman J. "Regional cooperation in Scandinavia." International Organization 11.4 (1957): 597–614; relations with Denmark, Sweden, Finland, and Iceland, 1920–1955. online
 Pisarska, Katarzyna. "Peace Diplomacy and the Domestic Dimension of Norwegian Foreign Policy: The Insider's Accounts." Scandinavian Political Studies 38.2 (2015): 198–215.
 Riste, Olav. "The historical determinants of Norwegian foreign policy." in J. J. Holst, ed. Norwegian Foreign Policy in the 1980s (1985): 12–26.
 Salmon, Patrick. Scandinavia and the Great Powers 1890-1940 (2002) excerpt
 Salmon, Patrick. "How to write international history: Reflections on Norsk utenrikspolitikks historie." Diplomacy and Statecraft 9.1 (1998): 208–223.

External links
 Norwegian Ministry of Foreign Affairs website
 History of the Norwegian Ministry of Foreign Affairs (Norwegian)